Ethiopia competed at the 2020 Summer Olympics in Tokyo. Originally scheduled to take place from 24 July to 9 August 2020, the Games were postponed to 23 July to 8 August 2021, because of the COVID-19 pandemic. The country's participation in Tokyo marked its fourteenth appearance at the Summer Olympics since its debut in 1956, having missed three occasions due to joining the African (1976), Soviet (1984), and North Korean (1988) boycotts. Ethiopia left Tokyo with a total of four medals (1 gold, 1 silver, 2 bronze), a decrease from its previous overall tally at the 2016 Summer Olympics in Rio de Janeiro and its lowest medal count since 1996.

Medalists

Competitors
The following is the list of number of competitors in the Games.

Athletics

Ethiopian athletes further achieved the entry standards, either by qualifying time or by world ranking, in the following track and field events (up to a maximum of 3 athletes in each event):

Track & road events
Men

Women

Cycling

Road
Ethiopia entered one rider to compete in the women's Olympic road race, by securing an outright berth, as the highest-ranked cyclist, not yet qualified, at the 2019 African Championships in Addis Ababa.

Swimming

Ethiopia received a universality invitation from FINA to send a top-ranked male swimmer in his respective individual events to the Olympics, based on the FINA Points System of June 28, 2021.

Taekwondo

Ethiopia entered one athlete into the taekwondo competition for the first time. Solomon Demse secured a spot in the men's flyweight category (58 kg) with a top two finish at the 2020 African Qualification Tournament in Rabat, Morocco.

References

Nations at the 2020 Summer Olympics
2020
Olympics